Orthaspidoceras is an extinct ammonoid cephalopod genus belonging to the family Aspidoceratidae. These nektonic carnivores lived during the Jurassic period, Kimmeridgian age.

Description 
These shells are relatively involute and thick, with a quadrate-rounded or depressed whorls. The ornamentation consists of a row of coarse tubercles and fine streaks.

Distribution 
Jurassic deposites of Italy, Mexico, Switzerland and Yemen

References 

 Arkell, et al.,1957. Mesozoic Ammonoidea; Treatise on Invertebrate Paleontology, Part L (Ammonoidea). Geol Soc of America and Univ Kansas Press. p. L338-339.

External links 
 Repartition et evolution du fenre Othaspidoceras
 Crioceratites
 Lithotheque.franceserv

Jurassic ammonites
Fossils of Italy
Fossils of Mexico
Kimmeridgian life
Ammonitida genera
Aspidoceratidae